Athena Chu (born 25 October 1971) is a Hong Kong actress and singer. She is best known for her role as Zixia Fairy in A Chinese Odyssey (1995).

Early life and education 
On 25, October 1971, Chu was born in Kowloon, Hong Kong. Her father was a mathematics teacher who later started a business with her mother.

Chu attended The Hong Kong Academy for Performing Arts from 1990 to 1992, during which she hosted children's shows on the television station TVB.

Career 
After graduating in 1992, Chu made her film debut in Fight Back to School II (1992), which earned her a nomination at the Hong Kong Film Award for Best New Performer. Chu started to attract public attention with her interpretation of Huang Rong in the remake of Wuxia drama The Legend of the Condor Heroes (1994).

Chu worked again with Stephen Chow in A Chinese Odyssey (1995). The role of Zi Xia (also known as Daisy Fairy) shot Chu to widespread fame in Hong Kong and parts of Asia. Another one of Chu's most notable films is The Boss Up There (1999). Her portrayal of a drug addict who finds God earned her a nomination for Best Actress at the Golden Horse Film Awards.

Regarded by many as a sex symbol, Chu has generally been cast in flower vase roles. She even made two appearances in Wong Jing’s Raped by an Angel series. However, her role in Whispers and Moans (2007) won her recognition, despite not being nominated for any award.

Chu was the first Hong Kong actress to be nominated at the International Emmy Award for Best Actress, for her role as a disabled but inspirational women who overcomes all odds in the television series Wall-less World (2010).

After a five years hiatus from the entertainment industry since 2011, Chu announced her comeback in 2016 with three upcoming films.

Personal life
Chu began dating singer and actor Paul Wong of Beyond since 1998; and married him in 2012. Chu and Wong have a daughter Debbie (b. 2012).

Filmography

Discography

References

External links
 
 
 HK Cinemagic entry

1971 births
Living people
Hong Kong television actresses
Hong Kong film actresses
Alumni of The Hong Kong Academy for Performing Arts
21st-century Hong Kong women singers